Dennis or Denis Moran may refer to:

 Dennis Moran (rugby league) (born 1977), British rugby league footballer
 Dennis Moran (computer criminal) (1982–2013), American computer criminal
 Denis Moran (Gaelic footballer) (born 1956), Irish Gaelic footballer